Kydd, first published in 2001, is a historical novel by Julian Stockwin. This first instalment in Julian Stockwin's series of novels set during the Age of Fighting Sail tells the story of young Kydd, who is pressed into service on a British ship in 1793. The book is unusual in that the hero is an ordinary pressed man, not an officer as is most common in nautical fiction.

Plot introduction
The story: The year is 1793. Europe is ablaze with war. The Prime Minister, William Pitt the Elder, is under pressure to make an active move at sea from the highest authority in the realm; George III had appointed Pitt as Lord Warden of the Cinque Ports, a position whose incumbent was responsible for the coastal defences of the nation. In response to the pressure, despatches a squadron to appear off the French coast. To man the ships, ordinary people must be press-ganged.  Thomas Paine Kydd, a young wig-maker from Guildford, is seized, taken across the country to Sheerness and the great fleet anchorage of the Nore to be part of the crew of the fictional 98-gun line-of-battle ship Duke William.

The ship sails immediately and Kydd quickly has to learn the harsh realities of shipboard life fast; but despite all that he goes through in danger of tempest and battle he comes to admire the skills and courage of the seamen — taking up the challenge himself to become a true sailor.

Publication details
2001, UK, Hodder & Stoughton , Publication Date 5 April 2001, HB
2001, USA, Simon & Schuster , Publication Date 25 June 2001, HB
2001, UK, Hodder & Stoughton , Publication Date 5 April 2001, Audio Cassette (reading)
2002, UK, Hodder & Stoughton , Publication Date 11 October 2004, PB
2002, USA, Simon & Schuster , Publication Date 1 August 2002, PB

Footnotes

References

External links
 The Kydd Community, a discussion forum for all things Kydd.

2001 British novels
Historical novels
Novels set during the French Revolutionary War
Novels set on ships
Novels set during the Napoleonic Wars
Fiction set in 1793
Hodder & Stoughton books
Novels set in the 1790s
Cultural depictions of William Pitt the Younger